Daniel Edward Boyd is a former American football placekicker in the National Football League (NFL). He played for the Jacksonville Jaguars in the 2002 season. He is also a school music instructor.

College career
In four years at LSU, Boyd was mostly a kickoff specialist and backup field goal kicker, having only eight field goal attempts, converting two of them.

Professional career

Amidst a 2002 season of high turnover among placekickers on the Jacksonville Jaguars team, Boyd was signed to the squad with four games remaining. He became the fourth player to assume kicking duties in the regular season that year for the Jaguars. All of his scoring attempts went through the uprights, as he was a perfect 5 for 5 on field goals and 7 for 7 on extra points for a total of 22 points. He also had 17 kickoffs.

Boyd was waived on August 25, 2003.

Life outside of football
Danny Boyd also has a strong passion and talent in music. He has played the trumpet since childhood and he originally thought his career would be in music. After graduating from LSU, he got a job teaching music at Baton Rouge High School. He also taught band at Lakewood Ranch High School, and led other music groups at various middle schools and high schools.

References

1978 births
Living people
American football placekickers
Jacksonville Jaguars players
LSU Tigers football players